Gerasimou Glacier is a steep-walled tributary glacier,  long, entering the west side of Shackleton Glacier opposite the Gemini Nunataks, in the Queen Maud Mountains of Antarctica. It was named by the Texas Tech Shackleton Glacier Expedition, 1964–65, for Helen Gerasimou, a polar personnel specialist with the Office of Antarctic Programs, National Science Foundation.

References

Glaciers of Dufek Coast